The Holstein Switzerland Nature Park is a German federal nature park in  the Holstein Switzerland region of Schleswig-Holstein.

In 1986 an association called the Naturpark Holsteinische Schweiz was founded. Its members were the districts of Ostholstein, Plön and Segeberg and the parishes within the nature park.

The Nature Park Information Centre is located in the so-called Uhrenhaus ("clock house") on the estate of Plön Castle.

References

External links 

Official site 

Nature parks in Schleswig-Holstein